Dan McIvor may refer to:

 Dan McIvor (aviator) (1911–2005), Canadian aviator
 Dan McIvor (politician) (1871–1965), Canadian Member of Parliament for Fort William, 1935–1958